De'Carlo "CJ" Donaldson is an American football running back and tight end for the West Virginia Mountaineers.

Early life and high school
Donaldson grew up in Miami, Florida and attended Gulliver Preparatory School, where he played wide receiver on the football team. As a senior, he caught 81 passes for 1,164 yards and 13 touchdowns. Donaldson was rated a three-star recruit and initially committed to play college football Tulane. He later de-committed and signed to play at West Virginia over offers from Florida, Florida State, Miami, South Carolina, Louisville, Indiana, and Syracuse.

College career
Donaldson was recruited by West Virginia to play tight end. He was moved to running back during preseason training camp. Donaldson was named the Mountaineers' starting running back going into his freshman season. He was named the Big 12 Conference Newcomer of the Week for week 1 after rushing for 125 yards and one touchdown on seven carries and also blocking a kick on special teams in a 38-31 loss to Pittsburgh.

References

External links
West Virginia Mountaineers bio

Living people
American football running backs
West Virginia Mountaineers football players
Players of American football from Florida
Year of birth missing (living people)